Brachyleptura pernigra is a species of beetle in the family Cerambycidae. It was described by Linell in 1897.

References

Lepturinae
Beetles described in 1897